Robert Wilfred Holt (9 June 1913 – 1 May 1985) was an Australian politician, a member of the Victorian Legislative Assembly and, later, of the Parliament of Australia.

Born in Launceston, Tasmania, Holt was educated in Melbourne at Scotch College and the University of Melbourne. He became a barrister in 1940. In 1945, he was elected to the Victorian Legislative Assembly as the Labor member for Portland. He was defeated in 1947, but re-elected in 1950. He was Minister for Lands and Social Settlement from 1952–53, in the government of John Cain (Senior).

In 1955, Holt transferred to federal politics, winning the Australian House of Representatives seat of Darebin. Just three years later, in 1958, he retired from politics due to ill health. He was elected president of the Victorian branch of the Labor Party in 1962, but lost the presidency three years later, after criticising the branch and its poor electoral performance. Citing undue union control, he resigned from the party in 1973, saying he would vote Liberal and might join the Australia Party.

Holt died in 1985.

References

Australian Labor Party members of the Parliament of Australia
Members of the Australian House of Representatives for Darebin
Members of the Australian House of Representatives
Members of the Victorian Legislative Assembly
Victorian Ministers for the Environment
1913 births
1985 deaths
Melbourne Law School alumni
People educated at Scotch College, Melbourne
20th-century Australian politicians